The 1985 Holy Cross Crusaders football team was an American football team that represented the College of the Holy Cross during the 1985 NCAA Division I-AA football season. 

In their fifth and final year under head coach Rick E. Carter, the Crusaders compiled an 4–6–1 record. Leo Carlin, Ed Kutschke and Tom Patton were the team captains.

The Crusaders were briefly ranked in the national top 20, claiming No. 20 in the poll released Oct. 8. They fell out of the rankings after that week, and were not ranked at season's end.

This would be Holy Cross' final year as an independent, before joining the Colonial League. Colgate was the only future league football opponent on the Crusaders' 1985 schedule. The league was later renamed Patriot League, and continues to be Holy Cross' home conference as of 2020.

Holy Cross played its home games at Fitton Field on the college campus in Worcester, Massachusetts.

Schedule

References

Holy Cross
Holy Cross Crusaders football seasons
Holy Cross Crusaders football